Russell Earl "Bucky" Dent (born Russell Earl O'Dey; November 25, 1951) is an American former Major League Baseball (MLB) player and manager. He earned two World Series rings as the starting shortstop for the New York Yankees in 1977 and 1978 and was voted the World Series Most Valuable Player Award in 1978. Dent is most famous for his home run in a tie-breaker game against the Boston Red Sox at Fenway Park at the end of the 1978 regular season.

Early life
Born in Savannah, Georgia, to Denise O'Dey and Russell "Shorty" Stanford, Dent went home from the hospital with his mother's brother James Earl Dent, and James' wife, Sarah. Bucky and his half-brother were raised by the Dents, who changed his last name to "Dent", but his mother would not allow them to legally adopt. He and his half-brother were led to believe the Dents were their biological parents, until he was ten years old. Dent was told the woman he knew as his aunt was in fact his mother. Later in life, he was told the name of his father, whom he then found, thus sparking and developing a relationship.

Playing career

Early career
Dent grew up in Sylvania, Georgia, and Hialeah, Florida, graduating from Hialeah High School. The sixth overall pick in the 1970 MLB draft out of high school, by the age of 21 he was playing shortstop for the Chicago White Sox, wearing uniform  His best season with the White Sox was in 1975 when he batted .264, led American League shortstops with a .981 fielding percentage and was selected as a reserve for the MLB All-Star Game. After his $50,000-a-year contract expired at the conclusion of the 1976 campaign, he rejected the White Sox's three-year $500,000 offer. His agent Nick Buoniconti explained, "It's obvious that the White Sox can't afford Dent. He is one of the best shortstops in the American League, and he should be paid like one."

Dent was traded by the White Sox to the Yankees for Oscar Gamble, LaMarr Hoyt, minor league pitcher Bob Polinsky and  He signed a three-year $600,000 contract upon his arrival. For the Yankees, Dent was an upgrade over Fred Stanley, the starting shortstop the previous year. The Yankees gave him uniform number 20 and they went on to win the World Series that year.

1978
In 1978, Dent is widely remembered for hitting a three-run home run that gave the Yankees a  lead in the AL East division tie-breaker game against the Boston Red Sox. This was all the more remarkable because Dent was not a power hitter; his seventh-inning home run was one of only 40 he hit in his entire 12-year career. Further, Dent occupied the ninth spot in the batting order, not generally considered a power slot, and did it with a bat borrowed from center fielder Mickey Rivers. The Yankees went on to win the game  for the division title; Boston was left out of the playoffs, after squandering one of the largest July leads in major league history. Generations of Red Sox fans have since referred to him as "Bucky Fucking Dent".

Dent continued his unusually high production by batting .417 (10–24, 7 RBI) in the World Series, earning Series Most Valuable Player honors, as the Yankees again defeated the Los Angeles Dodgers in

1979–1984

A three-time All-Star, Dent remained the Yankees' shortstop until 1982, when he was traded to the Texas Rangers in August for outfielder Lee Mazzilli. During his six years with the Yankees, Dent lived in Wyckoff, New Jersey, in a home he later rented to Don Zimmer.

On the Rangers, his uniform number was 7. Dent returned to the Yankees briefly in 1984 (but never played a game) before finishing his career that season with the Kansas City Royals, wearing uniform number 21. He spent his entire 12-year playing career in the American League, with a .247 batting average and 423 RBI.

Tommy John observed that Dent's throwing arm was not the strongest and that his range was limited. In spite of that, he was extremely reliable on balls he was able to get to. "He knew how to position himself, and he got to balls that were missed by other shortstops with better range," John said, adding that the player "was kind of taken for granted, until the Yankees unloaded him and discovered what he meant to the infield".

Post-career activities
After retiring as a player, Dent managed in the Yankees' minor-league system, notably with the Columbus Clippers. Owner George Steinbrenner hired Dent only as a stopgap, and did not believe he could lead the Yankees back to postseason play. He intended to replace Dent with Billy Martin at the earliest opportunity in 1990, but those plans were brought undone when Martin died in a car accident on Christmas Day in 1989.

In 1989 Dent opened a baseball school at Delray Beach, Florida, which featured a miniature version of Fenway Park.  Although Dent had his greatest moment as a player at Fenway Park, his worst moment also came at Fenway Park when he was fired as manager of the Yankees. Dan Shaughnessy of The Boston Globe criticized Steinbrenner for firing Dent in Boston and said he should "have waited until the Yankees got to Baltimore" to fire Dent. He said that "if Dent had been fired in Seattle or Milwaukee, this would have been just another event in an endless line of George's jettisons. But it happened in Boston and the nightly news had its hook". He also said that "the firing was only special because...it's the first time a Yankee manager...was purged on the ancient Indian burial grounds of the Back Bay".  However, Bill Pennington called the firing of Dent "merciless." But Yankees television analyst Tony Kubek blasted at Steinbrenner for the firing in a harsh, angry way. At the beginning of the broadcast of the game on MSG Network, he said to Yankees television play-by-play announcer Dewayne Staats, "George Steinbrenner...mishandled this. You don't take a Bucky Dent (at) the site of one of the greatest home runs in Yankee history and fire him and make it a media circus for the Boston Red Sox." He then stared defiantly on camera and said to Steinbrenner, "You don't do it by telephone, either, George. You do it face to face, eyeball to eyeball...If you really are a winner, you should not have handled this like a loser." He then said, angrily, "George, you're a bully and a coward." He then said that "What all this does, it just wrecks George Steinbrenner's credibility with his players, with the front office and in baseball more than it already is–if that's possible. It was just mishandled." The firing of Dent shook New York to its core and the Yankees flagship radio station then, WABC, which also criticized the firing, ran editorials demanding that Steinbrenner sell the team.

From 1991 to 1994, Dent served on the coaching staff of the St. Louis Cardinals under manager Joe Torre, moving to the coaching staff of the Texas Rangers from 1995 to 2001.

In 2002, Dent served as the manager for the Omaha Royals, the Triple A affiliate of the Kansas City Royals.

In 2003, when the Green Monster seats were added to Fenway Park, Dent attended the first game and sat in a Green Monster seat that was very near to where his 1978 home run landed. No animosity was displayed towards him by Red Sox fans at that game, who were all cordial to him.

Dent threw out the first pitch to Yogi Berra in the seventh and final game of the 2004 American League Championship Series.

In November 2005, Dent became the bench coach for the Cincinnati Reds. The Cincinnati Reds released Dent on July 3, 2007; just a few days after releasing manager Jerry Narron. At the time, the Reds had the worst record in Major League Baseball.

Every year, ESPN hosts a company softball game named after Dent in Central Park, New York City.

Dent currently hosts a podcast, Deep to Left with Bucky Dent.

Managerial record

Non-baseball work
In 1979, Dent posed for a pin-up poster. That year he also appeared in the TV movie Dallas Cowboys Cheerleaders, portraying a wide receiver who was the love interest of one of the cheerleaders. He also appeared in the September 1983 issue of Playgirl magazine wearing a swimsuit.

In 2014, Dent made a cameo as a father in the feature film Walt Before Mickey.

Personal
He now lives in Bradenton, Florida, with his wife, Angie Aberson, with whom he eloped in November 2019.

His late wife, Marianne, died on October 22, 2015; they were the parents of twin children, Cody and Caitlin. He also has two children with his ex-wife, Karen “Stormie” Neale, Scott and Stacy.

One of his daughters, Caitlin,  played softball at North Carolina State from 2010 to 2013, and was an assistant coach for the Hofstra softball team during the 2015 season, while Cody Dent played baseball at Florida.

See also
 List of St. Louis Cardinals coaches

References

External links

 Bucky Dent Baseball School

1951 births
Living people
American League All-Stars
Chicago White Sox players
Cincinnati Reds coaches
Kansas City Royals players
Major League Baseball broadcasters
Major League Baseball bench coaches
Baseball players from Savannah, Georgia
Major League Baseball shortstops
Major League Baseball third base coaches
World Series Most Valuable Player Award winners
Fort Lauderdale Yankees managers
Miami Dade Sharks baseball players
New York Yankees coaches
New York Yankees managers
New York Yankees players
People from Sylvania, Georgia
People from Wyckoff, New Jersey
St. Louis Cardinals coaches
Texas Rangers coaches
Texas Rangers players